Alento is the name of two Italian rivers:

Alento (Abruzzo), in the provinces of Chieti and Pescara
Alento (Campania), in the province of Salerno